Alford Forest is a location in Ashburton District, Canterbury, New Zealand.

Alford Forest was named after Lord Alford, a member of the Canterbury Association.

In 1883, stones found in Alford Forest were identified as diamonds, leading to a brief "diamond rush" in the area, but the "diamonds" were eventually shown to be worthless crystals.

References 

Ashburton District